The Chicago, Milwaukee, St. Paul and Pacific Railroad (CMStP&P), better known as "Milwaukee Road" , was a Class I railroad that operated in the Midwest and Northwest of the United States from 1847 until 1986.

The company experienced financial difficulty through the 1970s and 1980s, including bankruptcy in 1977 (though it filed for bankruptcy twice in 1925 and 1935, respectively). In 1980, it abandoned its Pacific Extension, which included track in the states of Montana, Idaho, and Washington. The remaining system was merged into the Soo Line Railroad , a subsidiary of Canadian Pacific Railway , on January 1, 1986. Much of its historical trackage remains in use by other railroads. The company brand is commemorated by buildings like the historic Milwaukee Road Depot in Minneapolis and preserved locomotives such as Milwaukee Road 261 which operates excursion trains.

History

Chicago, Milwaukee, St. Paul and Minneapolis Railroad
The railroad that became the Milwaukee Road began as the Milwaukee and Waukesha Railroad in Wisconsin, whose goal was to link the developing Lake Michigan port City of Milwaukee with the Mississippi River. The company incorporated in 1847, but changed its name to the Milwaukee and Mississippi Railroad in 1850 before construction began. Extensions followed to Waukesha in February 1851, Madison, and finally the Mississippi River at Prairie du Chien in 1857.

As a result of the financial panic of 1857, the M&M went into receivership in 1859, and was purchased by the Milwaukee and Prairie du Chien Railroad in 1861. In 1867, Alexander Mitchell combined the M&PdC with the Milwaukee and St. Paul (formerly the La Crosse and Milwaukee Railroad Company) under the name Milwaukee and St. Paul. Critical to the development and financing of the railroad was the acquisition of significant land grants. Prominent individual investors in the line included Alexander Mitchell, Russell Sage, Jeremiah Milbank, and William Rockefeller.

In 1874, the name was changed to Chicago, Milwaukee, and St. Paul after constructing an extension to Chicago in 1872. The company absorbed the Chicago and Pacific Railroad Company in 1879, the railroad that built the Bloomingdale Line (now The 606) and what became the Milwaukee District / West Line as part of the 36-mile Elgin Subdivision from Halsted Street in Chicago to the suburb of Elgin, Illinois. In 1890, the company purchased the Milwaukee and Northern Railroad; by now, the railroad had lines running through Wisconsin, Minnesota, Iowa, South Dakota, and the Upper Peninsula of Michigan. 

The corporate headquarters were moved from Milwaukee to the Rand McNally Building in Chicago, America's first all-steel framed skyscraper, in 1889 and 1890, with the car and locomotive shops staying in Milwaukee. The company's general offices were later located in Chicago's Railway Exchange building (built 1904) until 1924, at which time they moved to Chicago Union Station.

Pacific Extension
In the 1890s, the company's directors felt they had to extend the railroad to the Pacific to remain competitive with other railroads. A survey in 1901 estimated costs to build to the Pacific Northwest as $45 million (equal to $ today). In 1905, the board approved the Pacific Extension, now estimated at $60 million, equal to $ today. The contract for the western part of the route was awarded to Horace Chapin Henry of Seattle. The subsidiary Chicago, Milwaukee and Puget Sound Railway Company was chartered in 1905 to build from the Missouri River to Seattle and Tacoma.

Construction began in 1906 and was completed three years later. The route chosen was  shorter than the next shortest competitor's, as well as better grades than some, but it was an expensive route, since the Milwaukee Road received few land grants and had to buy most of the land or acquire smaller railroads.

The two main mountain ranges that had to be crossed, the Rockies and the Cascades, required major civil engineering works and additional locomotive power. Original company maps denote five mountain crossings: Belts, Rockies, Bitterroots, Saddles, and Cascades. These are slight misnomers as the Belt mountains and Bitterroots are part of the Rockies. The route did not cross over the Little Belts or Big Belts, but over the Lenep-Loweth Ridge between the Castle Mountains and the Crazy Mountains.

Some historians question the choice of route, since it bypassed some population centers and passed through areas with limited local traffic potential. Much of the line paralleled the Northern Pacific Railway. Trains magazine called the building of the extension, primarily a long-haul route, "egregious" and a "disaster." George H. Drury listed the Pacific Extension as one of several "wrong decisions" made by the Milwaukee Road's management which contributed to the company's eventual failure.

Beginning in 1909, several smaller railroads were acquired and expanded to form branch lines along the Pacific Extension.
The Montana Railroad formed the mainline route through Sixteen Mile Canyon as well as the North Montana Line which extended North from Harlowton to Lewistown. This branch led to the settlement of the Judith Basin and, by the 1970s, accounted for 30% of the Milwaukee Road's total traffic.
The Gallatin Valley Electric Railway, originally built as an interurban line, was extended from Bozeman to the mainline at Three Forks. In 1927, the railroad built the Gallatin Gateway Inn, where passengers traveling to Yellowstone National Park transferred to buses for the remainder of their journey.
The White Sulphur Springs & Yellowstone Park Railway, originally built by Lew Penwell and John Ringling, primarily carried lumber and agricultural products.

Operating conditions in the mountain regions of the Pacific Extension proved difficult. The line snaked through mountainous areas, resulting in "long steep grades and sharp curves". Electrification provided an answer, especially with abundant hydroelectric power in the mountains, and a ready source of copper in Anaconda, Montana. Pleased with the result, the Milwaukee electrified its route in Washington between Othello and Tacoma, a further , between 1917 and 1920. This section traversed the Cascades through the  Snoqualmie Tunnel, just south of Snoqualmie Pass and over  lower in elevation. The single-track tunnel's east portal at Hyak included an adjacent company-owned ski area (1937−1950).

Following the 1984 abandonment of the Pacific Extension, Tacoma Rail purchased all of Milwaukee's lines south of Tacoma. Starting in 1990, the Chehalis–Centralia Railroad began operating over the section from Centralia to Curtis. In 2010 the line was sold to the Port of Chehalis and in 2019, The railroad purchased the line from Chehalis to Ruth. In 2021 the section from Highway 6 West to Curtis was leased. 

The two separate electrified districts were never unified, as the  Idaho Division (Avery to Othello) was comparatively flat down the St. Joe River to St. Maries and through eastern Washington, and posed few challenges for steam operation. Electrification cost $27 million, but resulted in savings of over $1 million per year from improved operational efficiency.

Bankruptcies
The Chicago, Milwaukee and Puget Sound Railway was absorbed by the parent company on January 1, 1913. The Pacific Extension, including subsequent electrification, cost the Milwaukee Road $257 million, over four times the original estimate of $60 million. To meet this cost, the Milwaukee Road sold bonds, which began coming due in the 1920s. Traffic never met projections, and by the early 1920s, the Milwaukee Road was in serious financial condition. This state was exacerbated by the railroad's purchase of several heavily indebted railroads in Indiana. The company declared bankruptcy in 1925 and reorganized as the Chicago, Milwaukee, St. Paul and Pacific Railroad in 1928.
In 1927, the railroad launched its second edition of the Olympian as a premier luxury limited passenger train and opened its first railroad-owned tourist hotel, the Gallatin Gateway Inn in Montana, southwest of Bozeman, via a spur from Three Forks.

The company scarcely had a chance for success before the Great Depression hit. Despite innovations such as the famous Hiawatha high-speed trains that exceeded , the railroad again filed for bankruptcy in 1935. The Milwaukee Road operated under trusteeship until December 1, 1945.

During WWII the CMSt.P&P sponsored one of the Army's MRS units the 757th Railroad Shop Battalion.

Postwar
The Milwaukee Road enjoyed temporary success after World War II. Out of bankruptcy and with the wartime ban on new passenger service lifted, the company upgraded its trains. The Olympian Hiawatha began running between Chicago and the Puget Sound over the Pacific Extension in 1947, and the Twin Cities Hiawatha received new equipment in 1948. Dieselisation accelerated and was complete by 1957. In 1955, the Milwaukee Road took over from the Chicago and North Western's handling of Union Pacific's streamliner trains between Chicago and Omaha.The whole railroad industry found itself in decline in the late 1950s and the 1960s, but the Milwaukee Road was hit particularly hard. The Midwest was overbuilt with a plethora of competing railroads, while the competition on the transcontinental routes to the Pacific was tough. The premier transcontinental streamliner, the Olympian Hiawatha, despite innovative scenic observation cars, was mothballed in 1961, becoming the first visible casualty. The resignation of President John P. Kiley in 1957 and his replacement with the fairly inexperienced William John Quinn was a pivotal moment. From that point onward, the road's management was fixated on merger with another railroad as the solution to the Milwaukee's problems.

Railroad mergers had to be approved by the Interstate Commerce Commission, and in 1969 the ICC effectively blocked the merger with the Chicago and North Western Railway (C&NW) that the Milwaukee Road had counted on and had been planning for since 1964. The ICC asked for terms that the C&NW was not willing to agree to. The merger of the "Hill Lines" was approved at around the same time, and the merged Burlington Northern came into being.

Early 1970s

The formation of Burlington Northern in 1970 from the merger of Northern Pacific, Great Northern, Burlington Route, and the Spokane, Portland and Seattle Railway on March 3 created a stronger competitor on most Milwaukee Road routes. To boost competition, the ICC gave the Milwaukee Road the right to connect with new railroads in the West over Burlington Northern tracks. Traffic on its Pacific Extension increased substantially to more than four trains a day each way as it began interchanging cars with Southern Pacific at Portland, Oregon and Canadian railroads at Sumas, Washington. The railroad's foothold on transcontinental traffic leaving the Port of Seattle increased such that the Milwaukee Road held a staggering advantage over BN, carrying nearly 80% of the originating traffic along with 50% of the total container traffic leaving the Puget Sound (prior to severe service declines after roughly 1974).

In 1970, the president of Chicago and North Western offered to sell the railroad to the Milwaukee Road outright. President William John Quinn refused, stating that it now believed only a merger with a larger system, not a slightly smaller one, could save the railroad. Almost immediately, the railroad filed unsuccessfully with the ICC to be included in the Union Pacific merger with the Chicago, Rock Island and Pacific Railroad.

By the mid-1970s, deferred maintenance on Milwaukee Road's physical plant, which had been increasing throughout the 1960s as it attempted to improve its financial appearance for merger, was beginning to cause problems. The railroad's financial problems were exacerbated by their practice of improving its earnings during that period by selling off its wholly owned cars to financial institutions and leasing them back. The lease charges became greater, and more cars needed to be sold to pay the lease payments. The railroad's fleet of cars was becoming older because more money was being spent on finance payments for the old cars rather than buying new ones. This contributed to car shortages that turned away business.

The Milwaukee Road chose at this time to end its mainline electrification. Its electric locomotive fleet was reaching the end of its service life, and newer diesel locomotives such as the EMD SD40-2 and the GE Universal Series were more than capable of handling the route. The final electric freight arrived at Deer Lodge, Montana on June 15, 1974.

In 1976, the Milwaukee Road exercised its right under the Burlington Northern merger to petition for inclusion based on its weak financial condition. The ICC denied it on March 2, 1977.

Final bankruptcy

Between 1974 and 1977, the Milwaukee Road lost $100 million, and the company filed for its third bankruptcy in 42 years on December 19, 1977. Judge Thomas R. McMillen presided over the bankruptcy until the Milwaukee Road's sale in 1985. The railroad's primary problem was that it possessed too much physical plant for the revenue it generated. In 1977, it owned  of track, and 36% of that mileage produced a mere 14% of the company's yearly revenue. The approach taken by the bankruptcy trustees was to sell or abandon unprofitable or marginally profitable lines, leaving a much smaller railroad which could be profitable. Outright liquidation was considered, but not pursued.

The most extensive abandonment eliminated the Milwaukee Road's transcontinental service to the West Coast. While the Burlington Northern merger generated more traffic on this route, it was only enough to wear out the deteriorating track, not enough to pay for rebuilding. This forced trains to slow at many locations due to bad track. A final attempt to devise a plan to rehabilitate the Pacific Extension under the Milwaukee Road Restructuring Act failed. Operations ended west of Miles City, Montana, on February 29, 1980.The new, smaller railroad began earning small profits in 1982 (that same year, its two commuter rail lines, collectively known as the Milwaukee District West and Milwaukee District North Lines respectively, were turned over to the Northeast Illinois Regional Commuter Rail Corporation, a forerunner of commuter rail agency Metra). Still in reorganization, the Milwaukee Road attracted interest from three potential buyers: the Grand Trunk Corporation, the Chicago and North Western Railway, and the Soo Line Railroad. The Interstate Commerce Commission approved the offers by both Soo Line and C&NW. Ultimately, Judge McMillen approved the former's offer on February 19, 1985. The Soo reorganized the property as The Milwaukee Road, Inc., prior to merging the Milwaukee into the company itself effective January 1, 1986.

The successor-in-interest to what remained of the Milwaukee Road after the Soo Line sale was its holding company, the Milwaukee Land Company, reverted to Chicago Milwaukee Corporation ownership (CMC). Without the railroad, CMC's primary function became disposal or redevelopment of Milwaukee Road real estate not sold to the Soo Line, which stretched from Bedford, Indiana, to Washington state. The larger properties were developed into big-box retail or industrial sites. The CMC itself was beset with legal and financial woes, filing for bankruptcy (under numerous versions of CMC/Heartland Partners), as a result of environmental cleanup costs and liabilities at former Milwaukee Road sites. CMC Heartland, and its various reincarnations, were dissolved in a final liquidation process that came to a close in 2010.  

Much of the abandoned Milwaukee PCE line has become rail trails. The Palouse to Cascades State Park Trail (formerly the John Wayne Pioneer Trail) in Washington, Milwaukee Road Rail Trail in Idaho, Route of the Hiawatha Trail in Idaho and Montana, Route of the Olympian in Montana, Midtown Greenway in Minnesota, Bugline Trail in Wisconsin, and Milwaukee Road Transportation Trailway in Indiana all run on sections of the right-of-way among others. Today, both the Milwaukee Road and Soo Line Railroad trackage make up the Midwest US routes of the Canadian Pacific Railway.

Milwaukee Road Historical Association now owns the Milwaukee Road trademarks/copyrights, except for the AAR reporting marks (MILW) used by Soo Line.

Passenger train service

The Milwaukee Road aggressively marketed passenger service through much of its history, maintaining a high quality of service until the end of private intercity passenger operations in 1971. The Milwaukee prided itself on its passenger operations, providing the nation with some of its most innovative and colorful trains. The railroad's home-built equipment was among some of the best passenger equipment ever run on any American railroad. The Milwaukee's reputation for high-quality service was the principal reason that Union Pacific shifted its service to the Milwaukee Road for its "City" streamliners in 1955.

The Milwaukee Road's Pioneer Limited was one of the first named trains and its colorful Hiawatha trains were among the nation's finest streamliners. The post-World War II Hiawatha trains remain a high-water mark for passenger train industrial design.

Starting in November 1955, the Milwaukee Road assumed joint operation of the Union Pacific's City of Los Angeles, City of Portland, City of Denver, and Challenger trains as well as the UP/Southern Pacific City of San Francisco. After assuming operation of the UP's services, the Milwaukee Road gradually dropped its orange and maroon paint scheme in favor of UP's Armour yellow, grey, and red, finding the latter easier to keep clean.

The Milwaukee Road's streamlined passenger services were unique in that most of its equipment was built by the railroad at its Milwaukee Menomonee Valley shops, including the four generations of Hiawatha equipment introduced in 1933–34, 1935, 1937–38, and 1947–48. Most striking were the "Beaver Tail" observation cars of the 1930s and the "Skytop Lounge" observation cars by industrial designer Brooks Stevens in the 1940s. Extended "Skytop Lounge" cars were also ordered from Pullman for Olympian Hiawatha service in 1951. The Olympian Hiawatha set, as well as some full-length "Super Domes" were later sold to the Canadian National Railway.

Regional passenger trains that the Milwaukee Road operated from Chicago up to Amtrak's assumption of passenger operations in 1971 included the Twin Cities Hiawatha serving Minneapolis, the Sioux serving Madison, Wisconsin, the Milwaukee Express serving Milwaukee, and the Varsity serving Madison. Amtrak still operates several services on the Milwaukee Road's Twin Cities mainline. Daily long distance service to and from the Pacific Northwest is provided by the Empire Builder along the Chicago-St. Paul route after the train was rerouted by Amtrak on the first day of operations on May 1, 1971. Amtrak also operates corridor services as the Hiawatha Service along the Chicago-Milwaukee section of the route.

For years, the Milwaukee Road also operated an extensive commuter rail service in the Chicago area. One branch served the northern suburbs and extended into the outer suburbs of Milwaukee, while another branch served the western suburbs. These services passed to the Regional Transportation Authority in 1982 after the Milwaukee Road's bankruptcy. They are still operated today by Metra, Chicago's commuter rail agency, as the Milwaukee District / North Line and Milwaukee District / West Line. Canadian Pacific dispatches Metra trains while running freight trains on both of these lines via trackage rights.

In popular culture
The 1930 film Danger Lights was filmed in the Milwaukee Road's yard and shop at Miles City, Montana and on the main line.
The 1935 Three Stooges short feature "Movie Maniacs" opens with the Stooges riding as hobos in a "C.M.& St.P.R.R." boxcar.
The Wausau, Wisconsin depot was used as the logo of Employers Insurance of Wausau (now part of Liberty Mutual). The logo itself was a combination of the downtown depot, with a backdrop of the community's skyline.
On August 26, 1999, the United States Postal Service issued the 33-cent All Aboard! 20th Century American Trains commemorative stamps featuring five celebrated American passenger trains from the 1930s and 1940s.
In the closing pages of The Great Gatsby, fictional narrator Nick Carraway recalls "coming back west from prep school and later from college at Christmas time." He describes riding the Chicago, Milwaukee and St. Paul from Chicago to his unnamed hometown. The hometown of F. Scott Fitzgerald, the novel's author, was St. Paul.
In the opening scene of Discovery Channel's Harley and the Davidsons mini-series, C.M.P. forces a land purchase from future Harley-Davidson founder Walter Davidson, under the pretense of eminent domain.

See also

 Milwaukee Road Roster
 Chicago, Milwaukee, St. Paul and Pacific Railroad Company Historic District
 Milwaukee Road Depot

Notes

References

Further reading

External links

 Milwaukee Road Historical Association
 Milwaukee Road History at the Milwaukee Public Library
 Milwaukee Road ski area and ski train history
 Milwaukee Road history (Puget Sound Model Railroad Engineers)
 All Aboard! 20th Century American Trains - 1999 USPS Stamp Program
 The Milwaukee Road
 The Gene H. Lawson collection: The Milwaukee Road, a Museum of Pictures - Picture collection along the Pacific Extension 1910–1980 approx.
 University of Washington Libraries Digital Collections – Transportation Photographs - Ongoing digital collection of photographs depicting various modes of transportation in the Pacific Northwest region and Western United States during the first half of the 20th century. Includes images of the Milwaukee Road.

 
Railway companies established in 1847
Railway companies disestablished in 1986
Former Class I railroads in the United States
Former components in the Dow Jones Transportation Average
Predecessors of the Canadian Pacific Railway
Defunct Idaho railroads
Defunct Illinois railroads
Milwaukee Road locomotives
Defunct Indiana railroads
Defunct Iowa railroads
Defunct Kentucky railroads
Defunct Minnesota railroads
Defunct Montana railroads
Defunct North Dakota railroads
Defunct South Dakota railroads
Defunct Washington (state) railroads
Defunct Wisconsin railroads
Railroads in the Chicago metropolitan area
Upper Peninsula of Michigan
Defunct Missouri railroads
Defunct Nebraska railroads
Defunct Michigan railroads
1847 establishments in Illinois
Companies that filed for Chapter 11 bankruptcy in 1925
Companies that filed for Chapter 11 bankruptcy in 1935
Companies that filed for Chapter 11 bankruptcy in 1977
American companies disestablished in 1986
American companies established in 1846